Owings may refer to:

People
 Albin Owings Kuhn (1916–2010), chancellor at the University of Maryland
 Chris Owings, American professional baseball utility player
 Donald H. Owings (1943–2011), professor of psychology at the University of California, Davis
 George W. Owings III (born 1945), American politician
 Lewis Owings (1820–1875), American politician, physician, and businessman
 Micah Owings (born 1982), American professional baseball player
 Nathaniel A. Owings (1903–1984), American architect and co-founder of Skidmore, Owings, and Merrill

Other uses
 Owings, Maryland, a community in the United States
 Skidmore, Owings and Merrill, an architectural firm

See also
 Owings Mills (disambiguation)